This is a list of notable people associated with Carleton University, such as faculty members and alumni.

Lineage and establishment

Chancellors 
 1952–1954 Harry Stevenson Southam
 1954–1968 Jack Mackenzie
 1969–1972 Lester B. Pearson
 1973–1980 Gerhard Herzberg
 1980–1990 Robert Gordon Robertson (Emeritus 1992–)
 1990–1992 Pauline Jewett
 1993–2002 Arthur Kroeger (Emeritus 2002–2008)
 2002 Ray Hnatyshyn
 2003–2008 Marc Garneau
 2008–2011 Herb Gray
 2011–2017 Charles Chi
 2018– Yaprak Baltacioğlu

Presidents 
 1942–1947 Henry Marshall Tory
 1947–1955 Murdoch Maxwell MacOdrum
 1955–1956 James Alexander Gibson (pro tempore)
 1956–1958 Claude Bissell
 1958–1972 Davidson Dunton
 1972–1978 Michael Kelway Oliver
 1979 James Downey (pro tempore) 1 January – 15 May
 1979–1989 William Edwin Beckel
 1989–1996 Robin Hugh Farquhar
 1996–2005 Richard J. Van Loon
 2005–2006 David W. Atkinson
 2006–2008 Samy Mahmoud (pro tempore), from 20 November 2006
 2008–2017 Roseann Runte
 2017–2018 Alastair Summerlee (interim)
 2018–2023 Benoit-Antoine Bacon

Chairs of the Board of Governors 
 1942–1949 Philip D. Ross, Honorary Chairman
 1942–1947 Henry Marshall Tory
 1947–1952 Harry Stevenson Southam 
 1952–1960 J.E. Coyne
 1960–1962 E.W. Richard Steacie
 1962–1965 C.C. Gibson
 1965–1972 David A. Golden
 1972–1974 James Lorne Gray 
 1974–1976 Russ J. Neill
 1976–1978 Hyman Soloway
 1978–1980 George A. Fierheller
 1980–1982 Denis A. Ross
 1982–1984 Clifford Thomas Kelley
 1984–1985 Jean Teron
 1985–1987 Claude Edwards
 1987–1989 Ross Cruikshank
 1990–1992 Donald Yeomans
 1992–1993 Sam Hughes
 1993–1995 Maureen O'Neil
 1995–1997 Ivan Fellegi
 1997–2000 Robert Laughton
 2000–2002 Allen Lumsden
 2002–2005 Jocelyn Ghent Mallett
 2005–2006 Margaret Bloodworth
 2006–2008 David M. Dunn
 2008–2010 Jacques Shore
 2010–2012 Gisele Samson-Verreault
 2012–2014 Ronald Jackson
 2014–2016 Anthony (Tony) Tattersfield
 2016–2018 Christopher Carruthers
 2018–2020 Nik Nanos
 2020–current Dan Fortin

Notable alumni and faculty

Academics
 Emma Anderson, professor at University of Ottawa 
 Andrew Brook, Chancellor's Professor of Philosophy and Cognitive Science
 Madhu Dikshit, cardiovascular biologist and N-Bios laureate
 Ivan Fellegi, former Chief Statistician of Canada
 Peter Grünberg, Nobel laureate in Physics 2007
 Erin Johnson, professor of theoretical chemistry at Dalhousie University
 Lawrence M. Krauss, physics professor at Arizona State University and popular science author
 Michael I. Krauss, professor at George Mason University School of Law
 Randal Marlin, Carleton philosophy professor specializing in the study of propaganda
 Ryan North, writer and computer scientist
 Robin Neill, economic historian
 Norm O'Reilly, Professor at University of Guelph
 John Porter, former Professor of Sociology
 Kenneth B. Storey, current Professor of Biology
 Lyal S. Sunga, expert in international human rights, humanitarian law and international criminal law
 Wayne Cox, professor at Queen's University at Kingston
 William Sweet, Professor of Philosophy, Fellow of the Royal Society of Canada
 Edwin G. Pulleyblank, professor at the University of British Columbia

Entertainers
Elizabeth Hanna, undergraduate major in philosophy and later graduate of the National Theatre School of Canada; voice actor and speech-language pathologist
 Mervyn G.H. Hinds, Chicago blues musician, known as Harmonica Hinds
 K-OS (Kheaven Brereton), musician
 Mia Martina, pop singer, bestselling author
 Melody Anderson, retired actress, social worker
 Kayhan Kalhor, Grammy award–winning musician
 Norm Macdonald, comedian, actor
 Hamza Haq, actor
 Jeremy Gara, band drummer of Arcade Fire

Entrepreneurs
 Suhayya Abu-Hakima, co-founder and CEO of AmikaNow! and Amika Mobile Corporation
 David Azrieli, architect, 10th richest man in Canada
 Conrad Black, former businessman
 Trevor Matthews, founder and CEO of Brookstreet Pictures
 Eric Sprott, founder of Sprott Asset Management
 Shane Smith, co-founder and CEO of Vice
 Jamie Salter, founder and CEO of Authentic Brands Group

Journalists
 Rosemary Barton, political journalist and host of Power & Politics on CBC News Network
 Keith Boag, chief political correspondent for CBC News
 Rita Celli, host for Canadian Broadcasting Corporation
 Andrew Chang, television journalist
 Petronila Cleto, Filipino journalist, film critic and social activist 
 James Duthie, TSN host and Journalist
 Matthew Fraser, former Editor-in-Chief of National Post
 Edward Greenspon, former Editor-in-Chief of The Globe and Mail
 Greg Ip, economic journalist, The Wall Street Journal
 Peter Jennings, journalist and news anchor for ABC News, two-time Peabody Award winner, awarded a Litterarum doctor, honoris causa in 1997
 Carolyn Mackenzie, broadcaster
 Robert MacNeil, journalist, Officer of the Order of Canada
 Gavin McInnes, writer, founder of Vice
 Arthur Kent, Emmy award–winning war correspondent 
 Nahlah Ayed, Middle East correspondent for the CBC
 Sheila MacVicar, Emmy and Peabody Award–winning journalist 
 Paul Watson, Pulitzer Prize–winning photojournalist

Politicians
 Lester Bowles Pearson, former chancellor, professor, Prime Minister of Canada, Nobel Peace Prize laureate
 Niki Ashton, Member of Parliament, New Democratic Party leadership candidate
 Lindsay Blackett, first black Cabinet minister in Alberta
 Patrick Boyer, Member of Parliament
 Gord Brown, Member of Parliament
 Mike Colle, Member of Provincial Parliament
 Alex Cullen, Member of Provincial Parliament, Ottawa City Councillor
 Hans Daigeler, Member of Provincial Parliament
 Barry Devolin, former Member of Parliament
 Paul Dewar, former Member of Parliament
 Ward P.D. Elcock, Deputy Minister of Defence, former Director of Canadian Security Intelligence Service
 Catherine Fife, Member of Provincial Parliament, President of the Ontario Public School Boards Association
 Rob Ford, former Mayor of the City of Toronto, studied political science for a year
 Evelyn Gigantes, Member of Provincial Parliament
 Pauline Jewett, Member of Parliament, professor and Chancellor of Carleton University
 Leo Jordan, Member of Provincial Parliament
 Wilbert Keon, Senator, heart surgeon
 Catherine Kitts, Ottawa City Councillor
 John Manley, former Deputy Prime Minister and Finance Minister of Canada
 John Milloy Member of Provincial Parliament, Minister
 Claudia Mo, Member of Hong Kong Legislative Council
 John Nater, Member of Parliament
 Yasir Naqvi, Member of Parliament, former Member of Provincial Parliament
 Tom Nevakshonoff, Member of the Legislative Assembly of Manitoba
 Paul Okalik, former premier of Nunavut
 Ernie Parsons, Member of Provincial Parliament
 Michael Prue, Member of Provincial Parliament
 Scott Reid, Member of Parliament
 Omar Abdirashid Ali Sharmarke, former Prime Minister of Somalia
 Norm Sterling, Member of Provincial Parliament
 Barbara Sullivan, Member of Provincial Parliament
 Judy Wasylycia-Leis, former Member of Parliament
 Jim Watson, Member of Provincial Parliament, Mayor and City Councillor of Ottawa
 Omar Zakhilwal, former Professor of Economics, Afghan Finance Minister and Chief Economic Advisor to the President of Afghanistan
 Larisa Galadza, Canadian Ambassador to Ukraine

Others
 Shirley Barrie, playwright
 Chris Bailey, writer and productivity consultant
 Louise Charron, Puisne Justice of the Supreme Court of Canada
Tong Daochi, former secretary of the Chinese Communist Party of Sanya Committee
 Lorna deBlicquy, pioneering woman aviator
 Michelle Douglas, human rights activist
 Lorne Elias, inventor of the explosives vapour detector EVD-1
 Daniel Francis, writer and historian
 Allan Gregg, pollster, political pundit
 Sara Gruen, fiction author known best for award-winning novel Water for Elephants
 Gregory Henriquez, architect, Governor-General's Medal for Architecture
 Derek Holmes, IIHF Hall of Fame inductee
 Abdul Rahman Jabarah, alleged al-Qaeda member killed in 2003
 Jim Judd, Director of the Canadian Security Intelligence Service
 Warren Kinsella, lawyer, author, musician, political consultant, lobbyist and commentator
 Chalmers Jack Mackenzie, former chancellor, first president of Atomic Energy of Canada Limited
 Kenneth Chan Kai-tai, Hong Kong actor and television host for Cable TV Hong Kong channel
 Karim Rashid, industrial designer
 Amy Miller, filmmaker
 Michelle Mohabeer, filmmaker
 Howard Nuk, industrial designer (former VP of Design at Samsung and Co-founder at Palm)
 Cristine Rotenberg, crime statistics analyst and nail art YouTube personality
 Wayne Smith, current Chief Statistician of Statistics Canada
 Steven Sullivan, CEO MADD Canada
 Harley Swedler, architect
 Katie Tallo, filmmaker and writer
 Brian Wilks (born 1966), NHL hockey player 
 Susan Wood, Canadian literature scholar, pioneer of feminist science fiction studies
 Peter Worthington, Editor-in-Chief of the Toronto Sun
Waneek Horn-Miller, Olympian and activist
Linda Thom, Olympic gold medal-winning shooter

Notable honorary degree recipients 
 Daniel Alfredsson, former Ottawa Senators captain
 Murray Sinclair, Chairman of the Indian Residential Schools Truth and Reconciliation Commission (2009–2015), awarded a Legum Doctor, honoris causa in 2015
 Robert Thirsk, Canadian astronaut and engineer; awarded D.Eng., honoris causa in 2019
 Paul Martin, 21st Prime Minister of Canada (2003–2006); awarded Legum Doctor, honoris causa in 2019
 Dag Hammarskjöld, United Nations Secretary-General (1953–1961), Nobel Peace Prize laureate; awarded a Legum Doctor, honoris causa in 1954
 U Thant, United Nations Secretary-General (1961–1971); awarded a Legum Doctor, honoris causa in 1962
 Kurt Waldheim, United Nations Secretary-General (1972–1981); awarded a Legum Doctor, honoris causa in 1972
 Tommy Douglas, 7th Premier of Saskatchewan; led the first socialist government in North America and introduced universal public health care to Canada; awarded a Legum Doctor, honoris causa in 1980
 Javier Pérez de Cuéllar, United Nations Secretary-General (1982–1992); awarded a Legum Doctor, honoris causa in 1985
 Mikhail Gorbachev, General Secretary of the Communist Party of the Soviet Union; awarded a Legum Doctor, honoris causa in 1993
 Boutros Boutros-Ghali, United Nations Secretary-General (1992–1997); awarded a Legum Doctor, honoris causa in 1995
 Romano Prodi, 79th Prime Minister of Italy; awarded a Legum Doctor, honoris causa in 2001
 Kofi Annan, United Nations Secretary-General (1997–2007), Nobel Peace Prize laureate; awarded a Legum Doctor, honoris causa in 2004
 Michaëlle Jean, Governor General of Canada (2005–2010); awarded a Legum Doctor, honoris causa in 2012
 David Johnston, Governor General of Canada (2010–2017); awarded a Legum Doctor, honoris causa in 2016
 Peter Mansbridge, Canadian Broadcaster;  awarded a Legum Doctor, honoris causa in 2014
 Tomson Highway, Indigenous playwright and novelist; awarded Doctor of Fine Arts, honoris causa in 2013
 Muhammad Yunus, Bangladeshi social entrepreneur, banker, economist and civil society leader; awarded a Legum Doctor, honoris causa in 2010
 Herman Van Rompuy, 49th Prime Minister of Belgium (2008–2009) and then as the first permanent President of the European Council (2009–2014); awarded a Legum Doctor, honoris causa in 2017
 Helen Clark, 37th Prime Minister of New Zealand (1999–2008) and Administrator of the United Nations Development Programme (2009–2017); awarded a Legum Doctor, honoris causa in 2012
 Sheilah L. Martin, Canadian Judge, awarded Legum Doctor, honoris causa in 2021
 Buffy Ste-Marie, Indigenous musician; awarded Legum Doctor, honoris causa in 2008
 André Picard, Canadian journalist; awarded Legum Doctor, honoris causa in 2017
 Wanda Thomas Bernard; Canadian Senator;  awarded Legum Doctor, honoris causa in 2021

Other people

References

External links
Great Grads – Carleton Alumni Services
75 for the 75th – Faculty of Public Affairs, Carleton University
Charles Chi Named Next Carleton University Chancellor – Carleton Newsroom

 
Carleton University
Carleton University
Academic staff of Carleton University
University people